Scagglethorpe is a village and civil parish in the Ryedale district of North Yorkshire, England. Until 1974 the village lay in the historic county boundaries of the East Riding of Yorkshire.

On Charlton Place is the site of a medieval manor house.

In the 1086 Domesday Book Scagglethorpe is written as "Scachetorp". The manor, in the East Riding Hundred of Scard,  comprised one household. Lordship of the manor had passed to Robert, Count of Mortain, who also became Tenant-in-chief.

Scagglethorpe is derived from the Viking word "Schachetorp", meaning hamlet of a man called Skakull or Skakli.

On Village Street is Scagglethorpe Manor, a Grade II listed 17th-century farmhouse with an early-19th-century wing. Pevsner also notes a  Gothic-style Wesleyan Methodist chapel and a cottage with a Gothic porch. The chapel is part of the Malton Methodist Circuit.

Village facilities include a public house, playing field and a village hall.

References

External links

"Scagglethorpe Yorkshire", A Vision of Britain through Time. Retrieved 14 June 2012

Villages in North Yorkshire
Civil parishes in North Yorkshire